The 2013 Rafael Nadal tennis season is regarded as one of the greatest comeback seasons of all time. After not playing since June of the previous year, his season began on February 5 with the Chile Open, where he finished as the runner-up. Nadal rebounded with title victories at São Paulo and Acapulco. He then won the first Masters event of the year at Indian Wells. Nadal next finished runner-up to Novak Djokovic at Monte-Carlo, breaking his consecutive win streak for the first time in nine years. He followed that with victories at Barcelona, Madrid, and Rome. At the French Open, he defeated Djokovic in an epic semifinal, before defeating David Ferrer to win his eighth French Open crown. He was then stunned by Steve Darcis in the first round of Wimbledon, in what would be his only defeat prior to the semifinals of a tournament all season. Limping in the final set of the match, many thought his season was over. However, a strong hardcourt summer saw Nadal sweep Montreal, Cincinnati, and then the US Open (def. Djokovic), thus achieving the Summer Slam and clinching the US Open Series. He became the third player in history, after Patrick Rafter and Andy Roddick, to win all three events in succession. This granted him US$3.6 million in prize money, the most money earned by a male tennis player at a single tournament. A few days after the US Open final, he flew to Madrid to help the Spanish Davis Cup team secure their World Group Playoff spot for 2014, with a singles victory against Sergiy Stakhovsky and a doubles victory with Marc López.

Year summary

South American clay court season

Following 222 days injured, Nadal returned to the tennis court on February 5 at the Chile Open. He played both single and double-events and reached the final in both tournaments.
At the double-event he partnered up with the Argentine Juan Mónaco.

The next event for Nadal was the Brasil Open. He again played both the singles and doubles events, in which he partnered up with David Nalbandian who also was his opponent in the final of the singles event. Nadal managed to overcome Nalbandian to win his first title in 2013.

Two weeks later Nadal played the Mexico Open, where he beat David Ferrer in the final to win his second title in a row.
Following the Golden Swing Nadal confirmed his participation for the hardcourt event BNP Paribas Open in Indian Wells in the USA taking place from March 4 to March 18.

Indian Wells
In Indian Wells Nadal received a Bye in the first round. In the second round he faced Ryan Harrison and managed to beat him in straight sets. Nadal was drawn to face Leonardo Mayer next, but Mayer withdrew from the tournament due to an injury. Nadal's next opponent was Ernests Gulbis who was on a thirteen match winning streak before Nadal defeated him in three tight sets to reach the quarterfinals where he played against his long-time rival Roger Federer. Nadal was able to overcome Federer in two sets. In the semifinals he played the World No. 6 Tomáš Berdych and managed again to win in two sets, which helped him to reach the final for the fourth time in his career. His opponent was Juan Martín del Potro who had previously beaten world No. 1 Novak Djokovic in the semifinals. Nadal defeated del Potro in three sets, winning his record-breaking twenty-second ATP Masters 1000 event and his third Indian Wells title. Nadal subsequently withdrew from the Sony Ericsson Open in Miami in order to rest and prepare for the clay court season.

European Clay Court Season
At Monte-Carlo Nadal reached his ninth straight final but lost in two sets to Djokovic.
He won in Barcelona in straight sets and then won the Madrid title for a record-breaking 23rd Masters 1000 title, before extending the record to 24 with three top 6 wins in a row against Ferrer, Berdych, and then Federer in an easy two set victory at the 2013 Rome Masters.
Nadal capped off his streak with a ninth straight final this year at the 2013 French Open, defeating Djokovic in an epic match that finished 9–7 in the fifth set. Nadal won the first set and led in the second by a break, but Djokovic then took four straight games to win the set. Nadal responded by dominating the third and led twice by a break in the fourth, but Djokovic broke back on both occasions. As a result, Nadal failed to serve out the match and faltered in the subsequent tiebreak. The momentum seemed to be with Djokovic, who broke at the beginning of the fifth and led 4–2 before Nadal made an impressive comeback. The match was reminiscent of their 2012 encounter at the Australian Open final. This time the match time was 4:37. In the final Nadal thrashed an in-form Ferrer in straight sets, breaking his own record and winning an unprecedented 8th French Open Championship.

During the European clay season, Nadal earned a total of 5,100 points, making it (as of 2023) its most successful year in his entire career.

Grass Court Season
Nadal withdrew from Halle and played at Wimbledon. He was on a 22 match winning streak, when for the first time in his career, he lost a first round match at a Grand Slam, losing in three sets to lower-ranked Steve Darcis of Belgium. Many people speculated that this was the end of the year for Nadal, who was limping and visibly uncomfortable in his match.

American Hard Court Season
Nadal took a break after Wimbledon. He regained his form in Montreal, destroying dangerous server Jerzy Janowicz in the first round. He then put up a strong performance to beat No.1 Djokovic on the hard courts during the semifinal, beating him in the tie-breaker in the final set. He defeated  Milos Raonic in the final in straight sets to win his third title in Montreal and a record 25th masters title.
Nadal broke his own record yet again and won his 26th ATP Masters 1000 in  Cincinnati Masters, beating Benjamin Becker, Dimitrov, Federer in the QF, Tomas Berdych, and finally John Isner in the final on Sunday 18 August. 
Nadal entered the final Major of the year having missed the previous edition last year due to injury. Cruising through the first three rounds, he defeated Philipp Kohlschreiber in 4 sets in the 4th round, and then reached the final in winning the rest of matches in straight sets. In the final, Nadal yet again faced Djokovic. This was their 6th meeting in a Major final. Rafa took the first set, Novak took the second. But Rafa then gained momentum and won the next two sets to win the title. Thus Rafael Nadal won his second US Open Championship, and his 13th Major overall, putting him third on the all-time list behind Federer (17) and Sampras (14). He became the 3rd player after Patrick Rafter and Andy Roddick to win the Summer Slam (Won Canada, Cincinnati, and the US Open in the same year). He remained undefeated so far on Hard Courts in 2013.

Asian Fall & Indoor Hard Court Season
At the China Open Nadal returned to the No.1 ranking by reaching the final. He had a noteworthy comeback in the quarter-finals against Fabio Fognini, where he fought back from a set and break down to secure the victory. In the final he lost to Djokovic in two sets. Nadal was defeated at the Shanghai Masters by del Potro in the semi-finals. Nadal's final tournament of the year before the World Tour Finals was at the Paris Masters. In Paris, Nadal reached the semifinals where he was defeated by compatriot David Ferrer for the first time in their last 10 head-to-head meeting. At the Barclays ATP World Tour Finals Nadal was unbeaten  (3–0) in round robin play and by winning his first 2 matches sealed the Year End ATP World No. 1 Ranking in the process. In the semifinals Nadal faced long time rival Roger Federer, and recorded his first indoor win against the Swiss at the ATP World Tour Finals in straight sets. In the final he faced Novak Djokovic but lost in straight sets.

All matches

Singles matches

Doubles matches

Tournament schedule

Singles schedule
Nadal's 2013 singles tournament schedule is as follows:

1 The symbol (i) = indoors means that the respective tournament will be held indoors.

2 The ATP numbers between brackets = non-countable tournaments.

3 Since Rafael Nadal withdrew from the Swiss open in the final part of the season this tournament became countable and the points were eligible for rankings.

Yearly records

Head-to-head matchups
Ordered by number of wins

 Tomáš Berdych 5–0
 David Ferrer 5–1
 Roger Federer 4–0
 Stanislas Wawrinka 4–0
 Philipp Kohlschreiber 3–0
 Fabio Fognini 3–0
 Carlos Berlocq 3–0
 Novak Djokovic 3–3
 Richard Gasquet 2–0
 Nicolás Almagro 2–0
 Milos Raonic 2–0
 Jerzy Janowicz 2–0
 Grigor Dimitrov 2–0
  Ernests Gulbis 2–0
 Benoît Paire 2–0
 Marinko Matosevic 2–0
 Ryan Harrison 2–0
 Martín Alund 2–0
 David Nalbandian 1–0
 Juan Martín del Potro 1–1
 Jo-Wilfried Tsonga 1–0
 Tommy Robredo 1–0
 Mikhail Youzhny 1–0
 John Isner 1–0
 Kei Nishikori 1–0
 Alexandr Dolgopolov 1–0
 Marcel Granollers 1–0
 Jérémy Chardy 1–0
 Martin Kližan 1–0
 Ivan Dodig 1–0
 Santiago Giraldo 1–0
 Sergiy Stakhovsky 1–0
 Pablo Andújar 1–0
 Benjamin Becker 1–0
 Daniel Brands 1–0
 Albert Ramos 1–0
 Federico Delbonis 1–0
 Daniel Gimeno-Traver 1–0
 Leonardo Mayer 1–0
 João Souza 1–0
 Rogerio Dutra Silva 1–0
 Jesse Levine 1–0
 Diego Schwartzman 1–0
 Horacio Zeballos 0–1
 Steve Darcis 0–1

Finals

Singles: 14 (10–4)

Exhibition matches
Rafael Nadal took part in the annual BNP Paribas Showdown, where he faced Juan Martín del Potro in a rematch of their 2009 US Open semi-final. Nadal was defeated in straight sets.

Earnings

Bold font denotes tournament win

See also
2013 Roger Federer tennis season
2013 Novak Djokovic tennis season
2013 Andy Murray tennis season
2013 ATP World Tour

References

External links 
 
ATP tour profile

2013 Rafael Nadal tennis season
 
Nadal tennis season